The Anderson Street Bridge, also known as the Cedar Lane Bridge, is a fixed-span road bridge over the Hackensack River in Hackensack and Teaneck in Bergen County, New Jersey, U.S. The crossing was built in 1971 to replace an earlier structure. Being structurally deficient, the bridge was given weight restrictions in 2012 and was partially closed in 2016 for interim repairs. It is one of several bridges over the river in Hackensack, including the Court Street Bridge, the Midtown Bridge, and those that carry Interstate 80 and Route 4.

Earlier crossings

Records indicate that a wooden bridge was built on the site in 1858 and replaced by a new crossing in the early 20th century.

Weight limitations and reconstruction
In 2012 due to structural deficiencies, the bridge was limited to vehicles of less than 15 tons, and two outer lanes were closed, thus precipitating the re-routing of more than 400 weekday bus trips, affecting New Jersey Transit bus routes 83, 157, 168, 175, 178, 182, 751, 753, 755, 772, and 780.

In 2016, eastbound lanes were closed for interim repairs until such time as it can be permanently repaired or replaced.

In 2017, the North Jersey Transportation Planning Authority (NJTPA) allocated $432,000 for a study to consider reconstruction or replacement of the bridge, to take place in 2018. Replacement of the failing bridge remains unfunded. As of 2020, it remained NJTPA concern. After passage of the Infrastructure Investment and Jobs Act in November 2021, New Jersey officials announced on January 18, 2022 that funding from the bill would be used to fund $40 million of improvements to the bridge, with construction slated to start in 2023 and finish three years later.

See also
List of crossings of the Hackensack River
List of county routes in Bergen County, New Jersey
Anderson Street station
Hackensack Bus Terminal

References

External links
East Anderson Street / Cedar Lane Bridge Replacement Project

Hackensack, New Jersey
Teaneck, New Jersey
Road bridges in New Jersey
Bridges in Bergen County, New Jersey
Bridges over the Hackensack River
Bridges completed in 1971
Steel bridges in the United States
Box girder bridges in the United States